Marina Pettersson, born 1955, is a Swedish social democratic politician who has been a member of the Riksdag since 1997.

External links
Marina Pettersson at the Riksdag website

1955 births
Living people
Members of the Riksdag from the Social Democrats
Women members of the Riksdag
Members of the Riksdag 2002–2006
21st-century Swedish women politicians